Byte [Computer Superstores Ltd] was a retail venture of Specialist Computer Holdings Ltd in the United Kingdom which from 1993 sold primarily computer hardware, software and accessories in large stores on retail parks, (similar to PC World). The company was acquired by PC World in 1998 who re-branded or closed each store - leaving the Byte name to no longer exist.

In April 2012, a UK based Entrepreneur successfully applied for and was granted the Byte trademark.  In January 2013 Byte [Technology Ltd] was incorporated with the intention of relaunching the Byte brand which by now had not been seen in the UK for over 15 years.  Byte was officially relaunched as an on-line retailer (www.byte.co.uk) in January 2015 with a range of high quality Apple Certified accessories, and consumer electronics.

References

Consumer electronics retailers of the United Kingdom